Phaneta pauperana is a moth of the family Tortricidae. It is found in most of central and southern Europe.

The wingspan is 12–17 mm. Adults are on wing from April to May.

The larvae feed on Rosa canina.

External links
Images
Fauna Europaea
UKmoths

Olethreutinae
Moths of Europe
Moths described in 1842